Monfette may refer to:

Persons 
Claudine Monfette (born 1945), a Quebec actress, screenwriter and lyricist
Joseph-Victor Monfette (1841–1924), farmer and Canadian politician in Quebec

Places 
Petite rivière à Monfette, a river in Centre-du-Québec, Québec, Canada